Kalachakram is a 1973 Indian Malayalam-language film, directed by K. Narayanan and written by Sreekumaran Thampi. The film stars Prem Nazir, Jayabharathi, Bahadoor and Adoor Bhasi. It was released on 16 March 1973.

Plot

Cast
Prem Nazir as Ravi
Jayabharathi as Radha
Sasi
Adoor Bhasi as Kochukuttan
T. S. Muthaiah
Bahadoor as Prabhu
Radhamani
Rani Chandra
Sudheer
Vincent
Mammootty as Coxswain (bit part, uncredited)

Production 

.

Soundtrack
The music was composed by G. Devarajan and the lyrics were written by Sreekumaran Thampi.

References

External links
 

1973 films
1970s Malayalam-language films